Dan Park (born May 4, 1968) is a Swedish street artist who has been arrested, fined, and sentenced to jail for hate speech in Swedish Courts several times for his art.

Controversies and convictions 
In 2009 Parks was on trial for placing swastikas and boxes labeled "Zyklon B" in front of a Jewish community center.

In 2011, Park was arrested for a collage poster depicting an Afro-Swede student activist naked and in chains along with text saying "Our negro slave has run away", and the activist's personal contact information. Park singled out the student activist for reporting a student party with people in blackface. Park was convicted of defamation and racial agitation, and given a suspended sentence, fined, and ordered to pay damages.

In 2014, Park was arrested at the opening of an exhibition of his collage posters, and was sentenced to 6 months in jail for incitement to racial agitation and defamation, and ordered to pay a total of 60,000 kronor ($8,700) in damages to four people depicted in his pictures.  Additionally, the court ordered 9 of his works destroyed.

In 2018 Park was sentenced to three months jail for publicly using racial slurs on social media and alleging rape culture was common among immigrants. The judges dismissed his claim someone else used his social media account without his knowledge as "far-fetched". The sentence was later increased to four months by an appeals court.

Park has been accused of associating himself with the far-right Pegida movement and Swedish neo-nazi groups, denied the Holocaust and expressed support for the Norwegian terrorist and mass-murderer Anders Breivik.

In 2021 Dan Park was featured in an exhibition at the CSW museum in Warsaw in Poland. At his arrival to the museum he was filmed by activists who was standing outside protesting, one of them holding up a mirror with the words "I hope you are not looking at a fascist" which made several visitors angry, trying to explain that the exhibition is about freedom of expression and anti-fascism. Dan Park is asked by an activist if he is a nazi, to which he ansvers "no, I am a street artist" and "what do you mean by nazism?" and "I think everyone should have freedom of speech, even nazis". He explains to a smaller group of older activists that he has visited Auschwitz and he shows them his fake Auschwitz tattoo to which they respond "shame on you". During the exhibition, Park refused to answer people's questions about whether he sympathized with nazism or not, but he said quickly that he supports "free speech for everyone", including "nazis and muslims". Later on he was asked if he has sympathy for the victims of the Holocaust to which he replied that he "was not born back then" and that he "feels sympathy for people today" and that there is a Holocaust today for the animals because people eat meat and drink milk (Park is known to be a vegan).

Critical reception 
Park himself insists that his works are not racist, but a satiric commentary on current events and against political correctness in Sweden. Park is mainly notable for the intense public debate about freedom of speech that his case and works have generated, especially in Denmark, where his works have been exhibited in the Parliament building.

In an opinion published by The National Organization of Artists (Konstnärernas Riksorganisation), Swedish art critic Robert Stasinski does not believe Park's images can qualify as art as it is not possible to defend that ″they are open to multiple possibilities of interpretation" and neither Park nor his exhibitors have tried to give the images any broader artistic context. He concludes that that is "not a sign that Dan Park is a bad or undeveloped artist, it is probably a sign that he never wanted to be one."

Artist Lars Vilks, who created controversy with his drawings of Mohammed, calls Parks a defender of the freedom of expression.

Art journalist Øyvind Strømmen said that Park's street art often conveys a message of far-right extremism and that Parks is at best a poser and provocateur, but likely worse than that.

References

Living people
Swedish artists
Street artists
1968 births
Censorship in the arts
People convicted of racial hatred offences
Race-related controversies in art
Swedish Holocaust deniers